Rieti Airport is an aerodrome located  northwest of Rieti, a city in the Lazio region in Italy. It is also known as G. Ciuffelli Airport.

The aerodrome is operated by the Ministry of Transport and Navigation and administered by the Italian Civil Aviation Authority (ENAC) of Rome/Ciampino. The air traffic service (ATS) authority is ENAV S.p.A.  Prior to 1997 it was a military airport operated by the Italian Air Force.

Facilities
It has two runways with grass surfaces. The main runway 16R/34L measures  and is used by aircraft with engines. The secondary runway 16L/34R measures  and is used by glider aircraft. Operation of ultralight aircraft is restricted to three one-hour time periods each day, during which other air traffic is prohibited.

The airport hosts a helicopter base which, until 2016, was operated by the State Forestry Corps; after the dissolution of the agency, the base is operated by Carabinieri.

The airport also hosts some facilities used by students of Rieti's military school for CBRN defense: the shooting range and the "NUBICH" exercise area.

Air currents in the Rieti Plain are particularly favorable for gliding and offer the best conditions to fly, so the airport is well known among gliders all over the world; it hosted the 1982, 1994 and 2015 editions of the European Gliding Championships.

See also

List of airports in Italy

References

External links
 Aero Club Rieti
 A Brief History of Rieti Airport (archived by Wayback Machine, translated by Google)
 Aircraft photos from Rieti - G. Ciuffelli (LIQN)
 
 

Airports in Italy
Transport in Lazio
Rieti